The Danaé was a 44-gun Consolante-class frigate of the French Navy.

On 12 March 1811, she was part of Bernard Dubourdieu's squadron sailing to raid the British commerce raider base of the island of Lissa. The squadron encountered William Hoste's frigate squadron, leading to the Battle of Lissa. 

In the night of 4 September 1812, she exploded in the harbour of Trieste.

References

External links 
  BATAILLE DE LISSA

Age of Sail frigates of France
Ships built in Genoa
Shipwrecks in the Adriatic Sea
Maritime incidents in 1812
1807 ships
Frigates of the French Navy
Consolante-class frigates
Ships sunk by non-combat internal explosions